Horace Harrison Smith (October 5, 1905 – 1976) was an American diplomat. He was a career diplomat of the United States Foreign Service, and was the United States Ambassador to Laos from 1958 to 1960.

Biography
Horace H. Smith was born in Xenia, Greene County, on October 30, 1905. He later joined the U.S. Foreign Service and became a career officer some time later. In 1932 he was a U.S. Vice Consul in Guangzhou. In 1938 he was a U.S. Consul in Jinan. On March 26, 1958, President Eisenhower nominated Smith to be the United States Ambassador to Laos. He presented his credentials on April 9, 1958, and served in that position until June 21, 1960. He died in 1976 at about 70 years of age.

References

Ambassadors of the United States to Laos
1905 births
1976 deaths
United States Foreign Service personnel
People from Xenia, Ohio